Ɯ (minuscule: ɯ) is a letter that was used in the Zhuang alphabet from 1957 to 1986 to represent a close back unrounded vowel. At some time in or before 1986, it was replaced with W.

In the International Phonetic Alphabet, it is used to represent the same vowel.

Usage on computers

Latin-script letters
Phonetic transcription symbols